The Andrew Ten Eyck House is a historic farm house located at 671 Old York Road in the township of Branchburg in Somerset County, New Jersey. It was added to the National Register of Historic Places on May 6, 2004, for its significance in architecture.

History and description

The house was built  as a single-bedroom home for Andrew A. Ten Eyck (1762–1842) and his wife Mary Ten Eyck, a Dutch couple. It features Federal style and Colonial Revival style. In 1914, it was greatly expanded by adding a frame section to the original brick section.

It was used as a tenant residence for more than 100 years, which is why much of its historic character was kept.

In the early 1990s, the house and the land near it was purchased to create the Murray Corporate Center. When the developer proposed that the house be demolished, members of the community formed the Branchburg Historical Society for the purpose of saving the house.

In recent years, the house has been restored and is set to be a local-history museum. The back of the house portion will be used as a meeting space.

See also
 National Register of Historic Places listings in Somerset County, New Jersey

References

External links
 
 Somerset County's Weekend Journey through the Past

Branchburg, New Jersey
Houses in Somerset County, New Jersey
Houses completed in 1790
Colonial Revival architecture in New Jersey
Federal architecture in New Jersey
Brick buildings and structures
Houses on the National Register of Historic Places in New Jersey
National Register of Historic Places in Somerset County, New Jersey
New Jersey Register of Historic Places